The Juno I was a four-stage American space launch vehicle, used to launch lightweight payloads into low Earth orbit. The launch vehicle was used between January 1958 to December 1959. The launch vehicle was a member of the Redstone launch vehicle family, and was derived from the Jupiter-C sounding rocket. It is commonly confused with the Juno II launch vehicle, which was derived from the PGM-19 Jupiter medium-range ballistic missile. In 1958, a Juno I launch vehicle was used to launch America's first satellite, Explorer 1.

History 
Developed as a part of the  Explorer Project, the original goal for the launch vehicle was to place an artificial satellite into orbit. Following the Soviet Union's launch of Sputnik 1 on October 4, 1957 (and the resulting "Sputnik crisis") and the failure of the Vanguard 1 launch attempt, the program received funding to match the Soviet space achievements. The launch vehicle family name was proposed in November 1957 by Jet Propulsion Laboratory (JPL) Director Dr. William Pickering, who proposed the name Juno, after the Roman goddess and queen of the gods, as well as for its position as the satellite-launching version of the Jupiter-C. The fourth stage for the Juno I launch vehicle was derived following the September 1956 test launch of a Jupiter-C for the Army Ballistic Missile Agency, which could have been the world's first satellite launch, had a fourth stage been loaded and fueled. This fourth stage would have allowed the nose cone to overshoot the target and enter orbit.

The first launch of a Juno I launch vehicle was in early 1958, with the successful launch of Explorer 1 satellite on February 1, 1958, at 03:47:56 GMT, after the Soviet Union's Sputnik 1 on October 4, 1957. The launch had been originally been scheduled for January 29, 1958, but was scrubbed twice. Explorer 1 was the first U.S. satellite, and became the first satellite to confirm the existence of the Van Allen radiation belt. Following the first successful launch of the launch vehicle, five more Juno I launch attempts occurred, two successful, three failures. The final launch attempt was on October 23, 1958, from Cape Canaveral Launch Pad 5, which ended in failure.

Launch vehicle 
The Juno I consisted of a Jupiter-C first stage, based on the Redstone missile; with three additional solid fuel stages based on the Sergeant missile to provide the added impulse to achieve orbit. The tub along with the fourth stage were set spinning while the launch vehicle was on the launch pad to provide gyroscopic force in lieu of a guidance system that would have required thrust vectoring, vernier thrusters, or a reaction control system. The booster guidance package (with the tub attached) separated from the first stage after burnout to provide attitude control until second stage ignition. This multi-stage system, designed by Wernher von Braun in 1956 for his proposed Project Orbiter, obviated the need for a guidance system in the upper stages. It was the simplest method for putting a payload into orbit but having no upper-stage guidance, the payload could not achieve a precise orbit. Both the four-stage Juno I and three-stage Jupiter-C launch vehicles were the same height, with the added fourth-stage booster of the Juno I being enclosed inside the nose cone of the third stage.

Launch history 
Following the successful launch of Explorer 1 on February 1, 1958, the first U.S. satellite, Juno I made five more launches before being retired in favor of Juno II. Although Juno I's launch of the Explorer 1 satellite was a huge success for the U.S. space program, only two of its remaining five flights were successful, Explorer 3 and Explorer 4, giving the Juno I vehicle a mission total success ratio of 50%. The Juno I vehicle was replaced by the Juno II in 1959.

The American public was happy and relieved that America had finally managed to launch a satellite after the launch failures in the Vanguard and Viking series. With the relative success of the Juno I program, von Braun developed the Juno II, using a PGM-19 Jupiter first stage, rather than a Redstone.

Gallery

References

External links 
 Source: Data Sheet, Department of Astronautics, National Air and Space Museum, Smithsonian Institution.

1958 in spaceflight
Space launch vehicles of the United States